Robert Charbel Farah Maksoud (born 20 January 1987) is a Colombian professional tennis player, who is a former world No. 1 in doubles. He reached a career-high singles ranking of No. 163 in June 2011, but has achieved most of his success in doubles. 

Farah is a two-time Grand Slam Champion, having won both the Wimbledon Championships and the US Open in 2019 in men's doubles, alongside compatriot Juan Sebastián Cabal. The pair also finished runners-up at the 2018 Australian Open, and Farah reached the final in mixed doubles at the 2016 Wimbledon Championships and 2017 French Open with Anna-Lena Grönefeld.

Farah has won 19 doubles titles on the ATP Tour, including two at Masters 1000 level, and became world No. 1 in doubles for the first time on 15 July 2019. He has spent a total of 68 weeks at the top of the doubles rankings, and was year-end No. 1 in both 2019 and 2020. Farah has represented Colombia in the Davis Cup since 2010, as well as at the 2016 and at the 2020 Olympic Games.

College career
Farah played college tennis at the University of Southern California from 2006 to 2010 where he won two NCAA Division I Men's Tennis Championships as a USC Trojan. He finished his Senior season(2010) as the No. 1 ranked NCAA D1 player in the US in singles, while additionally ranked 2nd in doubles. He won the 2008 NCAA Men's Doubles National Championship, partnering Kaes Van't Hof. He occasionally played doubles at USC with future ATP pro Steve Johnson.

Professional career

2011
Farah's consistent doubles partnership with fellow countryman Juan Sebastián Cabal began at Wimbledon 2011, when they defeated the pair consisting of Pakistani Aisam Qureshi (8 in doubles) and Indian Rohan Bopanna (9 in the world), in a tight three set match that went to 21–19 in the final set, before losing in second round against American Michael Russell and Kazakhstani Mikhail Kukushkin in straight sets.

2013
In the 2013 Australian Open, Farah and Cabal made their first appearance in the quarterfinals.

2016
In 2016, Farah reached his first grand slam final, in the mixed doubles at Wimbledon partnering Anna-Lena Grönefeld. They lost in straight sets to Henri Kontinen of Finland and Heather Watson of the UK.

2017
In 2017, Farah and Cabal reached their first men's doubles grand slam semifinal at the French Open. In the same tournament he reached the final of the mixed doubles partnering Gronefeld where they lost to Rohan Bopanna and Gabriela Dabrowski in 3 sets.

2019: Two Grand Slam and Second Masters titles, World No. 1
Farah and countryman Cabal won their first ever grand slam men's doubles title at Wimbledon in 2019, defeating Frenchmen Nicolas Mahut and Édouard Roger-Vasselin in a thrilling 5 set match that required 4 tie-break sets; this victory helped Farah and Cabal to both ascend to world No. 1 in the week following the conclusion of the Championships.

2022: Two Masters finals

Personal life
Farah Maksoud is the son of a family of Lebanese descent. His mother is a teacher at the French Liceo Paul Valery de Cali. His father is a tennis player (not recognized at professional level). In 2010, Robert became a professional tennis player.

Provisional Suspensions

In July 2018, Farah was given a suspended three months ban and fined £3,800 for promoting a gambling website on his twitter. Farah would only serve the suspension if there were further breaches of the Tennis Anti-Corruption Program.

In October 2019, Farah was tested positive for the anabolic steroid Boldenone. He was provisionally suspended from official tournaments from 14 January 2020 and did not compete at the 2020 Australian Open. Farah argued that he had ingested Boldenone from contaminated Colombian meat and the ITF chose not to ban him, holding that he "bears no fault or negligence for the violation".

Performance timelines

Doubles
Current through the 2022 Mexican Open.

Mixed doubles

Major finals

Grand Slam finals

Doubles: 3 (2 titles, 1 runner-up)

Mixed doubles: 2 (2 runners-up)

Masters 1000 finals

Doubles: 7 (2 titles, 5 runner-ups)

ATP career finals

Doubles: 42 (19 titles, 23 runner-ups)

ATP Challenger & ITF Futures

Singles: 5 (3–2)

References

External links
 
 
 

1987 births
Living people
Sportspeople from Cali
Colombian male tennis players
Tennis players at the 2011 Pan American Games
Colombian people of Lebanese descent
Tennis players from Montreal
Pan American Games gold medalists for Colombia
Olympic tennis players of Colombia
Tennis players at the 2016 Summer Olympics
Pan American Games medalists in tennis
Doping cases in tennis
Grand Slam (tennis) champions in men's doubles
Wimbledon champions
US Open (tennis) champions
Medalists at the 2011 Pan American Games
Tennis players at the 2020 Summer Olympics
Sportspeople of Lebanese descent
USC Trojans men's tennis players
ATP number 1 ranked doubles tennis players
ITF World Champions